Napoleon Disentimed is a science fiction novel by American writer Hayford Peirce, first published by Tor Books in 1987.  It is a humorous treatment of two standard science fiction themes, those of time travel and of parallel universes.  The protagonist is a dapper, clever con man who, although born to humble origins in Bangor, Maine, United States, calls himself Sir Kevin Dean de Courtney MacNair of MacNair.  Through a complicated series of misadventures he ends up impersonating Napoleon Bonaparte for the dictator's so-called "Missing Years", 1806–1808.  By the end of the book he has succeeded in not only acquiring a beautiful wife and a slightly run-down château in France but in also inventing both the modern indoor flush toilet and Champagne.  A sequel to Napoleon Disentimed, also featuring the MacNair, is The Burr in the Garden of Eden.

External links

1987 American novels
1987 science fiction novels
American science fiction novels
Novels about time travel
Tor Books books